Queen of the Night (Italian:La donna di una notte) is a 1931 French comedy film directed by Marcel L'Herbier, assisted by Amleto Palermi and Guido Brignone, and starring Francesca Bertini, Ruggero Ruggeri and Romano Calò. It was filmed in Germany as the Italian-language version of the French film La Femme d'une nuit, also directed by L'Herbier. In the early years of sound it was common to remake films in different languages. A German-language version was also released the same year directed by Fritz Wendhausen.

The film's sets were designed by the art directors Boris Bilinsky and Paolo Reni.

Cast
 Francesca Bertini as La principessa Elena di Lystria  
 Ruggero Ruggeri as Jean Derville  
 Romano Calò as Il presidente del Consiglio  
 Giorgio Bianchi as Il tenente della guardia  
 Olga Berndt as Nanette  
 Oreste Bilancia as Rosiek  
 Raimondo Van Riel as Lo sconosciuto  
 Angelo Ferrari as L'ufficiale di polizia  
 Boris de Fast as Il portiere del principato di Lystria

References

Bibliography 
 Stefano Masi & Enrico Lancia. Les séductrices du cinéma italien. Gremese Editore, 1 January 1997''.

External links 
 

1931 films
French comedy films
1931 comedy films
1930s Italian-language films
Films directed by Marcel L'Herbier
Films scored by Michel Michelet
French multilingual films
French black-and-white films
1931 multilingual films
1930s French films